The Tetum alphabet is used to write Tetum. It is based on the Latin alphabet and contains 24 letters:

The accented letters á, é, í, ó, and ú are also used.

The letter W only occurs in some words of dialectal or foreign origin.

The letters G, J, Ñ, P, V, X, and Z and the digraphs LL and RR only occur in loanwords.

The letters C, Q, and Y are not used in Tetum, except in foreign proper names and international symbols.

The apostrophe is used to denote glottal stop.

External links
The standard orthography of the Tetum language (PDF)

Latin alphabets
Tetum language